Hans Ystgaard (19 February 1882 – 25 November 1953) was a Norwegian farmer and politician of the Norwegian Labour Party. He served as the Norwegian Minister of Agriculture from 1935–1945, and is to date the longest serving minister in said post. In local politics, he served as mayor of Sparbu from January until his appointment as agriculture minister in March 1935, and again from 1946 to 1947.

References

1882 births
1953 deaths
Ministers of Agriculture and Food of Norway
People from Steinkjer